George Palaiologos or Palaeologus was a Byzantine general, one of the most prominent military commanders and supporters of Emperor Alexios I Komnenos (r. 1081–1118). 

He was the son of the first known member of the Palaiologos family, the strategos of Mesopotamia Nikephoros Palaiologos. His wife Anna Doukaina was the sister of Irene Doukaina, the wife of Alexios I Komnenos, making him the emperor's brother-in-law. As Alexios Komnenos’ leading general and close friend, he played an important role in his campaigns, especially the Battle of Dyrrhachium against the Normans or the Battle of Levounion against the Pechenegs. He was the chief source used by Anna Komnene in her Alexiad on her father's battles, and is very favourably portrayed by her in her book as both capable and loyal.

Family
George had a younger brother, Nicholas. Through his marriage to Anna Doukaina, he had four sons: 
 Nikephoros, one of the ancestors of the Palaiologos family that became the Empire's ruling dynasty after 1261. He had issue:
 Michael
 Alexios, megas doux. Married to Irene Komnene.
 Andronikos Palaiologos, megas domestikos
 Andronikos, doux of Thessalonica. Married to Komnene, granddaughter of Constantine X  Doukas.
 Michael, a sebastos
 Alexios, married Anna Komnene Doukaina and he is the other ancestor of the imperial house of Palaiologos. He had issue:
 George Palaiologos, megas hetaireiarches
 Alexios despot. Married to Irene Angelina (daughter of Alexios III Angelos).
 Theodora Palaiologina, married to Andronikos Palaiologos, megas domestikos

References

Bibliography

 
 
 
 

11th-century Byzantine people
Byzantine generals
George
Generals of Alexios I Komnenos
Byzantine people of the Byzantine–Norman wars